

Events

Pre-1600
 532 – Nika riots in Constantinople: A quarrel between supporters of different chariot teams—the Blues and the Greens—in the Hippodrome escalates into violence.
 630 – Conquest of Mecca: The prophet Muhammad and his followers conquer the city, and the Quraysh association of clans surrenders.
1055 – Theodora is crowned empress of the Byzantine Empire.
1158 – Vladislaus II, Duke of Bohemia becomes King of Bohemia.
1569 – First recorded lottery in England.

1601–1900
1654 – Arauco War: A Spanish army is defeated by local Mapuche-Huilliches as it tries to cross Bueno River in Southern Chile.
1759 – The first American life insurance company, the Corporation for Relief of Poor and Distressed Presbyterian Ministers and of the Poor and Distressed Widows and Children of the Presbyterian Ministers (now part of Unum Group), is incorporated in Philadelphia, Pennsylvania.
1779 – Ching-Thang Khomba is crowned King of Manipur.
1787 – William Herschel discovers Titania and Oberon, two moons of Uranus.
1805 – The Michigan Territory is created.
1861 – American Civil War: Alabama secedes from the United States.
1863 – American Civil War: The three-day Battle of Arkansas Post concludes as General John McClernand and Admiral David Dixon Porter capture Fort Hindman and secure control over the Arkansas River for the Union.
1879 – The Anglo-Zulu War begins.

1901–present
1908 – Grand Canyon National Monument is created.
1912 – Immigrant textile workers in Lawrence, Massachusetts, go on strike when wages are reduced in response to a mandated shortening of the work week.
1914 – The Karluk, flagship of the Canadian Arctic Expedition, sank after being crushed by ice.
1917 – The Kingsland munitions factory explosion occurs as a result of sabotage.
1922 – Leonard Thompson becomes the first person to be injected with insulin.
1923 – Occupation of the Ruhr: Troops from France and Belgium occupy the Ruhr area to force Germany to make its World War I reparation payments.
1927 – Louis B. Mayer, head of film studio Metro-Goldwyn-Mayer (MGM), announces the creation of the Academy of Motion Picture Arts and Sciences, at a banquet in Los Angeles, California.
1935 – Amelia Earhart becomes the first person to fly solo from Hawaii to California.
1942 – World War II: Japanese forces capture Kuala Lumpur, the capital of the Federated Malay States.
  1942   – World War II: Japanese forces attack Tarakan in Borneo, Netherlands Indies (Battle of Tarakan)
1943 – The Republic of China agrees to the Sino-British New Equal Treaty and the Sino-American New Equal Treaty.
  1943   – Italian-American anarchist Carlo Tresca is assassinated in New York City.
1946 – Enver Hoxha, Secretary General of the Communist Party of Albania, declares the People's Republic of Albania with himself as head of state.
1949 – The first "networked" television broadcasts took place as KDKA-TV in Pittsburgh, Pennsylvania goes on the air connecting the east coast and mid-west programming.
1957 – The African Convention is founded in Dakar, Senegal.
1959 – 36 people are killed when Lufthansa Flight 502 crashes on approach to Rio de Janeiro/Galeão International Airport in Brazil.
1961 – Throgs Neck Bridge over the East River, linking New York City's boroughs of The Bronx and Queens, opens to road traffic.
1962 – Cold War: While tied to its pier in Polyarny, the Soviet submarine B-37 is destroyed when fire breaks out in its torpedo compartment.
  1962   – An avalanche on Huascarán in Peru causes around 4,000 deaths.
1964 – Surgeon General of the United States Dr. Luther Terry, M.D., publishes the landmark report Smoking and Health: Report of the Advisory Committee to the Surgeon General of the United States saying that smoking may be hazardous to health, sparking national and worldwide anti-smoking efforts.
1972 – East Pakistan renames itself Bangladesh.
1973 – Major League Baseball owners vote in approval of the American League adopting the designated hitter position.
1986 – The Gateway Bridge, Brisbane, Queensland, Australia is officially opened.
1994 – The Irish Government announces the end of a 15-year broadcasting ban on the IRA and its political arm Sinn Féin.
1995 – 51 people are killed in a plane crash in María La Baja, Colombia.
1996 – The Space Shuttle Endeavour is launched on mission STS-72 to retrieve the Japanese Space Flyer Unit.
1998 – Over 100 people are killed in the Sidi-Hamed massacre in Algeria.
2003 – Illinois Governor George Ryan commutes the death sentences of 167 prisoners on Illinois's death row based on the Jon Burge scandal.
2013 – One French soldier and 17 militants are killed in a failed attempt to free a French hostage in Bulo Marer, Somalia.
2020 – COVID-19 pandemic in Hubei: Municipal health officials in Wuhan announce the first recorded death from COVID-19.

Births

Pre-1600
 347 – Theodosius I, Roman emperor (d. 395)
 889 – Abd-ar-Rahman III, first Caliph of Córdoba (d. 961)
1113 – Wang Chongyang, Chinese religious leader and poet (d. 1170)
1209 – Möngke Khan, Mongolian emperor (d. 1259) 
1322 – Emperor Kōmyō of Japan (d. 1380)
1359 – Emperor Go-En'yū of Japan (d. 1393)
1395 – Michele of Valois, daughter of Charles VI of France (d. 1422)
1503 – Parmigianino, Italian artist (d. 1540)
1589 – William Strode, English politician (d. 1666)
1591 – Robert Devereux, 3rd Earl of Essex, English general and politician, Lord Lieutenant of Staffordshire (d. 1646)

1601–1900
1624 – Bastiaan Govertsz van der Leeuw, Dutch painter (d. 1680)
1630 – John Rogers, English-American minister, physician, and academic (d. 1684)
1638 – Nicolas Steno, Danish bishop and anatomist (d. 1686)
1642 – Johann Friedrich Alberti, German organist and composer (d. 1710)
1650 – Diana Glauber, Dutch-German painter (d. 1721)
1671 – François-Marie, 1st duc de Broglie, French general and diplomat (d. 1745)
1755 – Alexander Hamilton, Nevisian-American general, economist and politician, 1st United States Secretary of the Treasury (d. 1804)
1757 – Samuel Bentham, English engineer and architect (d. 1831)
1760 – Oliver Wolcott Jr., American lawyer and politician, 2nd United States Secretary of the Treasury, 24th Governor of Connecticut (d. 1833)
1777 – Vincenzo Borg, Maltese merchant and rebel leader (d. 1837)
1786 – Joseph Jackson Lister, English physicist (d. 1869)
1788 – William Thomas Brande, English chemist and academic (d. 1866)
1800 – Ányos Jedlik, Hungarian physicist and engineer (d. 1895)
1807 – Ezra Cornell, American businessman and philanthropist, founded Western Union and Cornell University (d. 1874)
1814 – James Paget, English surgeon and pathologist (d. 1899)
  1814   – Socrates Nelson, American businessman and politician (d. 1867)
1815 – John A. Macdonald, Scottish-Canadian lawyer and politician, 1st Prime Minister of Canada (d. 1891)
1825 – Bayard Taylor, American poet, author, and critic (d. 1878)
1839 – Eugenio María de Hostos, Puerto Rican lawyer, philosopher, and sociologist (d. 1903)
1842 – William James, American psychologist and philosopher (d. 1910)
1843 – Adolf Eberle, German painter (d. 1914)
1845 – Albert Victor Bäcklund, Swedish mathematician and physicist (d. 1912)
1850 – Joseph Charles Arthur, American pathologist and mycologist (d. 1942)
1852 – Constantin Fehrenbach, German lawyer and politician, 4th Chancellor of Weimar Germany (d. 1926)
1853 – Georgios Jakobides, Greek painter and sculptor (d. 1932)
1856 – Christian Sinding, Norwegian pianist and composer (d. 1941)
1857 – Fred Archer, English jockey (d. 1886)
1858 – Harry Gordon Selfridge, American-English businessman, founded Selfridges (d. 1947)
1859 – George Curzon, 1st Marquess Curzon of Kedleston, English politician, 35th Governor-General of India (d. 1925)
1864 – Thomas Dixon, Jr., American minister, lawyer, and politician (d. 1946)
1867 – Edward B. Titchener, English psychologist and academic (d. 1927)
1868 – Cai Yuanpei, Chinese philosopher, academic, and politician (d. 1940)
1870 – Alexander Stirling Calder, American sculptor and educator (d. 1945)
1872 – G. W. Pierce, American physicist and academic (d. 1956)
1873 – John Callan O'Laughlin, American soldier and journalist (d. 1949)
1875 – Reinhold Glière, Russian composer and academic (d. 1956)
1876 – Elmer Flick, American baseball player (d. 1971)
  1876   – Thomas Hicks, American runner (d. 1952)
1878 – Theodoros Pangalos, Greek general and politician, President of Greece (d. 1952)
1885 – Alice Paul, American activist and suffragist (d. 1977)
1886 – George Zucco, British actor (d. 1960)
1887 – Aldo Leopold, American ecologist and author (d. 1948)
1888 – Joseph B. Keenan, American jurist and politician (d. 1954)
1889 – Calvin Bridges, American geneticist and academic (d. 1938)
1890 – Max Carey, American baseball player and manager (d. 1976)
  1890   – Oswald de Andrade, Brazilian poet and critic (d. 1954)
1891 – Andrew Sockalexis, American runner (d. 1919)
1893 – Ellinor Aiki, Estonian painter (d. 1969)
  1893   – Charles Fraser, Australian rugby league player and coach (d. 1981)
  1893   – Anthony M. Rud, American journalist and author (d. 1942)
1895 – Laurens Hammond, American engineer and businessman, founded the Hammond Clock Company (d. 1973)
1897 – Bernard DeVoto, American historian and author (d. 1955)
  1897   – August Heissmeyer, German SS officer (d. 1979)
1899 – Eva Le Gallienne, English-American actress, director, and producer (d. 1991)

1901–present
1901 – Kwon Ki-ok, Korean pilot (d. 1988)
1902 – Maurice Duruflé, French organist and composer (d. 1986)
1903 – Alan Paton, South African author and activist (d. 1988)
1905 – Clyde Kluckhohn, American anthropologist and theorist (d. 1960)
1906 – Albert Hofmann, Swiss chemist and academic, discoverer of LSD (d. 2008)
1907 – Pierre Mendès France, French lawyer and politician, 142nd Prime Minister of France (d. 1982)
  1907   – Abraham Joshua Heschel, Polish-American rabbi, theologian, and philosopher (d. 1972)
1908 – Lionel Stander, American actor and activist (d. 1994)
1910 – Arthur Lambourn, New Zealand rugby player (d. 1999)
  1910   – Shane Paltridge, Australian soldier and politician (d. 1966)
1911 – Tommy Duncan, American singer-songwriter (d. 1967) 
  1911   – Nora Heysen, Australian painter (d. 2003)
  1911   – Zenkō Suzuki, Japanese politician, 70th Prime Minister of Japan (d. 2004)
1912 – Don "Red" Barry, American actor, producer, and screenwriter (d. 1980)
1913 – Karl Stegger, Danish actor (d. 1980)
1915 – Luise Krüger, German javelin thrower (d. 2001)
  1915   – Paddy Mayne, British colonel and lawyer (d. 1955)
1916 – Bernard Blier, Argentinian-French actor (d. 1989)
1917 – John Robarts, Canadian lawyer and politician, 17th Premier of Ontario (d. 1982)
1918 – Robert C. O'Brien, American author and journalist (d. 1973)
  1918   – Spencer Walklate, Australian rugby league player and soldier (d. 1945)
1920 – Mick McManus, English wrestler (d. 2013)
1921 – Gory Guerrero, American wrestler and trainer (d. 1990)
  1921   – Juanita M. Kreps, American economist and politician, 24th United States Secretary of Commerce (d. 2010)
1923 – Jerome Bixby, American author and screenwriter (d. 1998)
  1923   – Ernst Nolte, German historian and philosopher (d. 2016)
  1923   – Carroll Shelby, American race car driver, engineer, and businessman, founded Carroll Shelby International (d. 2012)
1924 – Roger Guillemin, French-American physician and endocrinologist, Nobel Prize laureate
  1924   – Sam B. Hall, Jr., American lawyer, judge, and politician (d. 1994)
  1924   – Slim Harpo, American blues singer-songwriter and musician (d. 1970)
1925 – Grant Tinker, American television producer, co-founded MTM Enterprises (d. 2016)
1926 – Lev Dyomin, Russian colonel, pilot, and astronaut (d. 1998)
1928 – David L. Wolper, American director and producer (d. 2010)
1929 – Dmitri Bruns, Estonian architect and theorist (d. 2020)
1930 – Ron Mulock, Australian lawyer and politician, 10th Deputy Premier of New South Wales (d. 2014)
  1930   – Rod Taylor, Australian-American actor and screenwriter (d. 2015)
1931 – Betty Churcher, Australian painter, historian, and curator (d. 2015)
  1931   – Mary Rodgers, American composer and author (d. 2014)
1932 – Alfonso Arau, Mexican actor and director
1933 – Goldie Hill, American country singer-songwriter and guitarist (d. 2005)
1934 – Jean Chrétien, Canadian lawyer and politician, 20th Prime Minister of Canada
1936 – Eva Hesse, German-American sculptor and educator (d. 1970)
1938 – Arthur Scargill, English miner, activist, and politician
1939 – Anne Heggtveit, Canadian alpine skier
1940 – Andres Tarand, Estonian geographer and politician, 10th Prime Minister of Estonia
1941 – Gérson, Brazilian footballer
1942 – Bud Acton, American basketball player
  1942   – Clarence Clemons, American saxophonist and actor (d. 2011)
1944 – Mohammed Abdul-Hayy, Sudanese poet and academic (d. 1989)
  1944   – Shibu Soren, Indian politician, 3rd Chief Minister of Jharkhand
1945 – Christine Kaufmann, German actress, author, and businesswoman (d. 2017)
1946 – Naomi Judd, American singer-songwriter and actress (d. 2022)
  1946   – Tony Kaye, English progressive rock keyboard player and songwriter
  1946   – John Piper, American theologian and author
1947 – Hamish Macdonald, New Zealand rugby player
1948 – Fritz Bohla, German footballer and manager
  1948   – Joe Harper, Scottish footballer and manager
  1948   – Madeline Manning, American runner and coach
  1948   – Wajima Hiroshi, Japanese sumo wrestler, the 54th Yokozuna (d. 2018)
  1948   – Terry Williams, Welsh drummer
1949 – Daryl Braithwaite, Australian singer-songwriter
  1949   – Mohammad Reza Rahimi, Iranian lawyer and politician, 2nd Vice President of Iran
1951 – Charlie Huhn, American rock singer and guitarist 
  1951   – Willie Maddren, English footballer and manager (d. 2000)
  1951   – Philip Tartaglia, Scottish archbishop (d. 2021)
1952 – Bille Brown, Australian actor and playwright (d. 2013)
  1952   – Ben Crenshaw, American golfer and architect
  1952   – Michael Forshaw, Australian lawyer and politician
  1952   – Diana Gabaldon, American author
  1952   – Lee Ritenour, American guitarist, composer, and producer
1953 – Graham Allen, English politician, Vice-Chamberlain of the Household
  1953   – Kostas Skandalidis, Greek engineer and politician, Greek Minister of Agricultural Development and Food
1954 – Jaak Aaviksoo, Estonian physicist and politician, 26th Estonian Minister of Defence
  1954   – Kailash Satyarthi, Indian engineer, academic, and activist, Nobel Prize laureate
1956 – Big Bank Hank, American rapper (d. 2014)
  1956   – David Grant, Australian rugby league player (d. 1994)
1957 – Darryl Dawkins, American basketball player and coach (d. 2015)
  1957   – Peter Moore, Australian rules footballer and coach
  1957   – Bryan Robson, English footballer and manager
1958 – Vicki Peterson, American singer-songwriter and guitarist
1959 – Brett Bodine, American NASCAR driver
  1959   – Rob Ramage, Canadian ice hockey player and coach
1961 – Lars-Erik Torph, Swedish racing driver (d. 1989)
1962 – Chris Bryant, Welsh politician, Minister of State for Europe
  1962   – Susan Lindauer, American journalist and activist
  1962   – Brian Moore, English rugby player
1963 – Tracy Caulkins, American-Australian swimmer
  1963   – Petra Schneider, German swimmer
1964 – Ralph Recto, Filipino lawyer and politician
  1964   – Albert Dupontel, French actor and director
1965 – Mascarita Sagrada, Mexican wrestler
  1965   – Aleksey Zhukov, Russian footballer and coach
1966 – Marc Acito, American author and screenwriter
1967 – Michael Healy-Rae, Irish politician
1968 – Anders Borg, Swedish economist and politician, Swedish Minister for Finance
  1968   – Tom Dumont, American guitarist and producer
  1968   – Steve Mavin, Australian rugby league player
1969 – Manny Acta, Dominican-American baseball player, coach, manager, and sportscaster
1970 – Manfredi Beninati, Italian painter and sculptor
  1970   – Chris Jent, American basketball player and coach
  1970   – Malcolm D. Lee, American director, producer, screenwriter, and actor
  1970   – Ken Ueno, American composer
1971 – Mary J. Blige, American singer-songwriter, producer, and actress
  1971   – Jeff Orford, Australian rugby league player
  1971   – Chris Willsher, English singer-songwriter, drummer, and actor
1972 – Christian Jacobs, American singer-songwriter, producer, and actor 
  1972   – Anthony Lledo, Danish composer
  1972   – Amanda Peet, American actress and playwright
1973 – Rockmond Dunbar, American actor
  1973   – Rahul Dravid, Indian cricketer and captain
1974 – Roman Görtz, German footballer
  1974   – Cody McKay, Canadian baseball player
  1974   – Jens Nowotny, German footballer
1975 – Rory Fitzpatrick, American ice hockey player
  1975   – Dan Luger, English rugby player and coach
  1975   – Matteo Renzi, Italian politician, 56th Prime Minister of Italy
1976 – Efthimios Rentzias, Greek basketball player
1977 – Shamari Buchanan, American football player
  1977   – Anni Friesinger-Postma, German speed skater
  1977   – Shane Kelly, Australian rugby league player
  1977   – Olexiy Lukashevych, Ukrainian long jumper
1978 – Vallo Allingu, Estonian basketball player
  1978   – Holly Brisley, Australian actress
  1978   – Michael Duff, Irish footballer
  1978   – Emile Heskey, English footballer
1979 – Darren Lynn Bousman, American director and screenwriter
  1979   – Michael Lorenz, German footballer
  1979   – Terence Morris, American basketball player
  1979   – Henry Shefflin, Irish hurler
  1979   – Siti Nurhaliza, Malaysian singer-songwriter and businesswoman
1980 – Josh Hannay, Australian rugby league player and coach
  1980   – Mike Williams, American football player
1982 – Tony Allen, American basketball player
  1982   – Clint Greenshields, Australian-French rugby league player
  1982   – Blake Heron, American actor (d. 2017)
  1982   – Son Ye-jin, South Korean actress
1983 – Turner Battle, American basketball player
  1983   – André Myhrer, Swedish skier
  1983   – Ted Richards, Australian rules footballer
  1983   – Adrian Sutil, German racing driver
1984 – Kevin Boss, American football player
  1984   – Dario Krešić, Croatian footballer
  1984   – Matt Mullenweg, American web developer and businessman, co-created WordPress
  1984   – Stijn Schaars, Dutch footballer
  1984   – Glenn Stewart, Australian rugby league player
1985 – Newton Faulkner, English singer-songwriter and guitarist
  1985   – Lucy Knisley, American author and illustrator
1987 – Scotty Cranmer, American Professional BMX rider
  1987   – Danuta Kozák, Hungarian sprint canoer
  1987   – Daniel Semenzato, Italian footballer
  1987   – Jamie Vardy, English footballer
  1987   – Kim Young-kwang, South Korean actor and model
1988 – Rodrigo José Pereira, Brazilian footballer
1989 – Kane Linnett, Australian rugby league player
1990 – Ryan Griffin, American football player
1991 – Andrea Bertolacci, Italian footballer
1992 – Dani Carvajal, Spanish footballer
  1992   – Lee Seung-hoon, South Korean rapper and dancer
1993 – Michael Keane, English footballer
  1993   – Will Keane, Irish footballer
  1993 – Park Junghwan, South Korean Go player
1995 – Nick Solak, American baseball player
1996 – Leroy Sané, German footballer
1997 – Cody Simpson, Australian singer-songwriter, guitarist, and actor
1998 – Thomas Mikaele, New Zealand rugby league player
1999 – Brandon Wakeham, Australian-Fijian rugby league player
2000 – Lee Chae-yeon, South Korean singer-songwriter

Deaths

Pre-1600
140 – Pope Hyginus, Bishop of Rome (b. 74) 
 705 – Pope John VI (b. 655)
 782 – Emperor Kōnin of Japan (b. 709) 
 812 – Staurakios, Byzantine emperor
 844 – Michael I Rangabe, Byzantine emperor (b. 770)
 887 – Boso of Provence, Frankish nobleman
 937 – Cao, empress of Later Tang
   937   – Li Chongmei, prince of Later Tang
   937   – Li Congke, emperor of Later Tang (b. 885)
   937   – Liu, empress of Later Tang
1055 – Constantine IX Monomachos, Byzantine emperor (b. 1000)
1068 – Egbert I, Margrave of Meissen
1083 – Otto of Nordheim (b. 1020)
1266 – Swietopelk II, Duke of Pomerania
1344 – Thomas Charlton, Bishop of Hereford and Lord Chancellor of Ireland
1372 – Eleanor of Lancaster, English noblewoman (b. 1318)
1396 – Isidore Glabas, Metropolitan bishop of Thessalonica (b.c. 1341)
1397 – Skirgaila, Grand Duke of Lithuania
1494 – Domenico Ghirlandaio, Italian painter (b. 1449)
1495 – Pedro González de Mendoza, Spanish cardinal (b. 1428)
1546 – Gaudenzio Ferrari, Italian painter and sculptor (b. c. 1471)
1554 – Min Bin, king of Arakan (b. 1493)

1601–1900
1641 – Juan Martínez de Jáuregui y Aguilar, Spanish poet and painter (b. 1583)
1696 – Charles Albanel, French priest, missionary, and explorer (b. 1616)
1703 – Johann Georg Graevius, German scholar and critic (b. 1632)
1713 – Pierre Jurieu, French priest and theologian (b. 1637)
1735 – Danilo I, Metropolitan of Cetinje (b. 1670)
1753 – Hans Sloane, Irish-English physician and academic (b. 1660)
1757 – Louis Bertrand Castel, French mathematician and philosopher (b. 1688)
1762 – Louis-François Roubiliac, French-English sculptor (b. 1695)
1763 – Caspar Abel, German poet, historian, and theologian (b. 1676)
1771 – Jean-Baptiste de Boyer, Marquis d'Argens, French philosopher and author (b. 1704)
1788 – François Joseph Paul de Grasse, French admiral (b. 1722)
1791 – William Williams Pantycelyn, Welsh composer and poet (b. 1717)
1798 – Heraclius II of Georgia (b. 1720)
1801 – Domenico Cimarosa, Italian composer and educator (b. 1749)
1824 – Thomas Mullins, 1st Baron Ventry, Anglo-Irish politician and peer (b. 1736)
1836 – John Molson, Canadian businessman, founded the Molson Brewing Company (b. 1763)
1843 – Francis Scott Key, American lawyer, author, and songwriter (b. 1779)
1866 – Gustavus Vaughan Brooke, Irish actor (b. 1818)
  1866   – John Woolley, English minister and academic (b. 1816)
1867 – Stuart Donaldson, English-Australian businessman and politician, 1st Premier of New South Wales (b. 1812)
1882 – Theodor Schwann, German physiologist and biologist (b. 1810)
1891 – Georges-Eugène Haussmann, French urban planner (b. 1809)

1901–present
1902 – Johnny Briggs, English cricketer and rugby player (b. 1862)
1904 – William Sawyer, Canadian merchant and politician (b. 1815)
1914 – Carl Jacobsen, Danish brewer and philanthropist (b. 1842)
1920 – Steinar Schjøtt, Norwegian philologist and lexicographer (b. 1844)
1923 – Constantine I of Greece (b. 1868)
1928 – Thomas Hardy, English novelist and poet (b. 1840)
1929 – Elfrida Andrée, Swedish organist, composer, and conductor (b. 1841)
1931 – James Milton Carroll, American pastor, historian, and author (b. 1852)
1937 – Nuri Conker, Turkish colonel and politician (b. 1882)
1941 – Emanuel Lasker, German mathematician, philosopher, and chess player (b. 1868)
1944 – Galeazzo Ciano, Italian politician, Italian Minister of Foreign Affairs (b. 1903)
1947 – Eva Tanguay, Canadian singer (b. 1879)
1952 – Jean de Lattre de Tassigny, French general (b. 1889)
  1952   – Aureliano Pertile, Italian tenor and educator (b. 1885)
1953 – Noe Zhordania, Georgian journalist and politician, Prime Minister of Georgia (b. 1868)
  1953   – Roberta Fulbright, American businesswoman (b.1874)
1954 – Oscar Straus, Austrian composer (b. 1870)
1957 – Robert Garran, Australian lawyer and politician, Solicitor-General of Australia (b. 1867)
1961 – Elena Gerhardt, German soprano and actress (b. 1883)
1963 – Arthur Nock, English-American scholar, theologian, and academic (b. 1902)
1965 – Wally Pipp, American baseball player (b. 1893)
1966 – Alberto Giacometti, Swiss sculptor and painter (b. 1901)
  1966   – Lal Bahadur Shastri, Indian academic and politician, 2nd Prime Minister of India (b. 1904)
1968 – Moshe Zvi Segal, Israeli linguist and scholar (b. 1876)
1969 – Richmal Crompton, English author and educator (b. 1890)
1972 – Padraic Colum, Irish poet and playwright (b. 1881)
1975 – Max Lorenz, German tenor and actor (b. 1901)
1980 – Barbara Pym, English author (b. 1913)
1981 – Beulah Bondi, American actress (b. 1889)
1985 – Edward Buzzell, American actor, director, and screenwriter (b. 1895)
  1985   – William McKell, Australian lawyer and politician, 12th Governor-General of Australia (b. 1891)
1986 – Sid Chaplin, English author and screenwriter (b. 1916)
  1986   – Andrzej Czok, Polish mountaineer (b. 1948)
1987 – Albert Ferber, Swiss-English pianist, composer, and conductor (b. 1911)
1988 – Pappy Boyington, American colonel and pilot, Medal of Honor recipient (b. 1912)
  1988   – Isidor Isaac Rabi, Polish-American physicist and academic, Nobel Prize laureate (b. 1898)
1989 – Ray Moore, English radio host (b. 1942)
1990 – Carolyn Haywood, American author and illustrator (b. 1898)
1991 – Carl David Anderson, American physicist and academic, Nobel Prize laureate (b. 1905)
1994 – Helmut Poppendick, German physician (b. 1902)
1995 – Josef Gingold, Belarusian-American violinist and educator (b. 1909)
  1995   – Onat Kutlar, Turkish author and poet (b. 1936)
  1995   – Lewis Nixon, U.S. Army captain (b. 1918)
  1995   – Theodor Wisch, German general (b. 1907)
1996 – Roger Crozier, Canadian-American ice hockey player (b. 1942)
1999 – Fabrizio De André, Italian singer-songwriter and guitarist (b. 1940)
  1999   – Naomi Mitchison, Scottish author and poet (b. 1897)
  1999   – Brian Moore, Irish-Canadian author and screenwriter (b. 1921)
2000 – Ivan Combe, American businessman, invented Clearasil (b. 1911)
  2000   – Bob Lemon, American baseball player and manager (b. 1920)
  2000   – Betty Archdale, English-Australian cricketer and educator (b. 1907)
2001 – Denys Lasdun, English architect, co-designed the Royal National Theatre (b. 1914)
2002 – Henri Verneuil, French-Armenian director and playwright (b. 1920)
2003 – Jože Pučnik, Slovenian sociologist and politician (b. 1932)
2007 – Solveig Dommartin, French-German actress (b. 1961)
  2007   – Robert Anton Wilson, American psychologist, author, poet, and playwright (b. 1932)
2008 – Edmund Hillary, New Zealand mountaineer and explorer (b. 1919)
  2008   – Carl Karcher, American businessman, co-founded Carl's Jr. (b. 1917)
2010 – Miep Gies, Austrian-Dutch humanitarian (b. 1909)
  2010   – Éric Rohmer, French director, screenwriter, and critic (b. 1920)
2011 – David Nelson, American actor, director, and producer (b. 1936)
2012 – Mostafa Ahmadi-Roshan, Iranian physicist and academic (b. 1980)
  2012   – Gilles Jacquier, French journalist and photographer (b. 1968)
  2012   – Edgar Kaiser, Jr, American-Canadian businessman and philanthropist (b. 1942)
  2012   – Wally Osterkorn, American basketball player (b. 1928)
  2012   – Steven Rawlings, English astrophysicist, astronomer, and academic (b. 1961)
  2012   – David Whitaker, English composer and conductor (b. 1931)
2013 – Guido Forti, Italian businessman, founded the Forti Racing Team (b. 1940)
  2013   – Nguyễn Khánh, Vietnamese general and politician, 3rd President of South Vietnam (b. 1927)
  2013   – Mariangela Melato, Italian actress (b. 1941)
  2013   – Tom Parry Jones, Welsh chemist, invented the breathalyzer (b. 1935)
  2013   – Alemayehu Shumye, Ethiopian runner (b. 1988)
  2013   – Aaron Swartz, American programmer and activist (b. 1986)
2014 – Keiko Awaji, Japanese actress (b. 1933)
  2014   – Muhammad Habibur Rahman, Indian-Bangladeshi jurist and politician, Prime Minister of Bangladesh (b. 1928)
  2014   – Chai Trong-rong, Taiwanese educator and politician (b. 1935)
  2014   – Ariel Sharon, Israeli general and politician, 11th Prime Minister of Israel (b. 1928)
2015 – Jenő Buzánszky, Hungarian footballer and coach (b. 1925) 
  2015   – Anita Ekberg, Swedish-Italian model and actress (b. 1931)
  2015   – Chashi Nazrul Islam, Bangladeshi director and producer (b. 1941)
  2015   – Vernon Benjamin Mountcastle, American neuroscientist and academic (b. 1918)
2016 – Monte Irvin, American baseball player (b. 1919)
  2016   – David Margulies, American actor (b. 1937)
2017 – Adenan Satem, Malaysian politician and Chief Minister of Sarawak, Malaysia (b. 1944)
2018 – Edgar Ray Killen, American murderer (b.1925)
2019 – Michael Atiyah, British-Lebanese mathematician (b.1929)
2023 – Carole Cook, American actress and singer (b. 1924)

Holidays and observances
 Children's Day (Tunisia) 
 Christian feast day:
 Anastasius of Suppentonia (Roman Catholic)
 Leucius of Brindisi (Roman Catholic)
 Paulinus II of Aquileia
 Pope Hyginus
 Theodosius the Cenobiarch
 Thomas of Cori
 Vitalis of Gaza (Roman Catholic)
 January 11 (Eastern Orthodox liturgics)
 Eugenio María de Hostos Day (Puerto Rico)
 Independence Resistance Day (Morocco)
 Kagami biraki (Japan)
 National Human Trafficking Awareness Day (United States)
 Republic Day (Albania)
 Carmentalia (January 11th and January 15th) (Rome)
 Prithvi Jayanti (Nepal)

References

External links

 BBC: On This Day
 
 Historical Events on January 11

Days of the year
January